Baroness Lane-Fox may refer to:

Felicity Lane-Fox, Baroness Lane-Fox (1918–1988), Conservative life peer
Martha Lane Fox, Baroness Lane-Fox of Soho (born 1973), British entrepreneur and crossbench life peer

Lane-Fox